Artlukh is a rural locality (a selo) and the administrative centre of Artlukhsky Selsoviet, Kazbekovsky District, Republic of Dagestan, Russia. The population was 365 as of 2010. There are 8 streets.

Nationalities 
Avars live there.

Geography
Artlukh is located 38 km south of Dylym (the district's administrative centre) by road. Danukh and Gadari are the nearest rural localities.

References 

Rural localities in Kazbekovsky District